One Step may refer to:

 "One Step" (Bettina Soriat song), the Austrian entry in the Eurovision Song Contest 1997 by Bettina Soriat 
 "One Step" (Kissing the Pink song), 1986
 One Step (film), an upcoming Korean film
 "One Step", a song by The Original 7ven from Condensate
 "One Step", a song by Killah Priest from Heavy Mental
 "One Step", a song by Ronnie Lane from See Me

See also
 One-Step, a ballroom dance